The refractive index of water at 20 °C for visible light is 1.33. The refractive index of normal ice is 1.31 (from List of refractive indices). In general, an index of refraction is a complex number with real and imaginary parts, where the latter indicates the strength of absorption loss at a particular wavelength. In the visible part of the electromagnetic spectrum, the imaginary part of the refractive index is very small. However, water and ice absorb in infrared and close the infrared atmospheric window thereby contributing to the greenhouse effect ...

The absorption spectrum of pure water is used in numerous applications, including light scattering and absorption by ice crystals and cloud water droplets, theories of the rainbow, determination of the single-scattering albedo, ocean color, and many others.

Quantitative description of the refraction index

Over the wavelengths from 0.2 μm to 1.2 μm, and over temperatures from −12 °C to 500 °C, the real part of the index of refraction of water can be calculated by the following empirical expression:

Where:
,
, and

and the appropriate constants are
 = 0.244257733,  = 0.00974634476,  = −0.00373234996,  = 0.000268678472,  = 0.0015892057,  = 0.00245934259,  = 0.90070492,  = −0.0166626219,  = 273.15 K, = 1000 kg/m3,  = 589 nm,  = 5.432937, and  = 0.229202.

In the above expression, T is the absolute temperature of water (in K),  is the wavelength of light in nm,  is the density of the water in kg/m3, and n is the real part of the index of refraction of water.

Volumic mass of water
In the above formula, the density of water also varies with temperature and is defined by:

with:

  = −3.983035 °C
  = 301.797 °C
  = 522528.9 °C2
  = 69.34881 °C
  = 999.974950 kg / m3

Refractive index (real and imaginary parts) for liquid water

The total refractive index of water is given as m = n + ik. The absorption coefficient α' is used in the Beer–Lambert law with the prime here signifying base e convention. Values are for water at 25 °C, and were obtained through various sources in the cited literature review.

See also
Absorption (electromagnetic radiation)
Atmospheric radiative transfer codes
Color of water
Electromagnetic absorption by water
Ocean color
Ocean optics
List of refractive indices

Notes

References

R. M. Pope and E. S. Fry, Absorption spectrum (380-700 nm) of pure water. II. Integrating cavity measurements, Appl. Opt., 36, 8710-8723, 1997.
Mobley, Curtis D., Light and water: radiative transfer in natural waters; based in part on collaborations with Rudolph W. Preisendorfer, San Diego, Academic Press, 1994, 592 p., 

Atmospheric radiation
Water
Physics-related lists
Scattering, absorption and radiative transfer (optics)
Water physics
Applied and interdisciplinary physics